Moinak Sengupta (born 30 December 1973) is an Indian former cricketer. He played six first-class matches for Bengal between 1995 and 2003.

See also
 List of Bengal cricketers

References

External links
 

1973 births
Living people
Indian cricketers
Bengal cricketers
People from Bhagalpur